Treven is a hamlet between Trevena and Tregatta in the parish of Tintagel, Cornwall, England, United Kingdom. Tintagel Primary School is at Treven.

References

Hamlets in Cornwall
Tintagel